Fish are vertebrates with gills and without digits.

Fish or FISH may also refer to:

Common, related meanings
 Fish, engage in the activity of fishing/catching fish
 Fish as food

People
Fish (nickname)
Fish (singer) (born 1958), former singer in the British neo-progressive rock group Marillion and solo artist
Fish (surname)
Fish Leong (born 1978), stage name of Jasmine Leong, Malaysian singer
Fish Mahlalela (born 1962), South African politician

Arts and entertainment

Characters
 Fish, a character in the comic strip Beyond the Black Stump
Michael Scofield, a lead character in the TV series Prison Break

Games
 Fish (card game), a simple card game
 Fish!, a computer game released by Magnetic Scrolls in 1988

Music
 "Fish" (song), by Craig Campbell, 2011
 "Fish", a song by The Damned on their 1977 album Damned Damned Damned
 "Fish", a song by King on their 1984 album Steps in Time
 "Fish", a song by Mr. Scruff from his 1999 album Keep It Unreal
 "Fish", a song by Bonnie Pink from her 2000 album Let Go
 "The Fish (Schindleria Praematurus)", a song by Yes, on their 1971 album Fragile

Television
Fish (British TV series), featuring an idealistic lawyer 
Fish (American TV series), a 1970s show featuring Detective Phillip Fish
"Fish", an episode of Thomas the Tank Engine and Friends

Science and technology
 FISH (cipher) (FIbonacci SHrinking), a stream cipher published in 1993
 Fish (cryptography) (sometimes FISH), British codeword for World War II German stream cipher teleprinter secure communications devices
 Files transferred over shell protocol, a network protocol for transferring files between computers and manage remote files
 First Invisible Super Hustler, a prototype reconnaissance aircraft design
 Fluorescence in situ hybridization (FISH), a technique used in genetics to detect DNA sequences
 Friendly interactive shell, a Unix command shell

Sports
 Fish, nickname of the Miami Dolphins National Football League team
 Fish, nickname of the Miami Marlins Major League Baseball team
 The Fish, nickname of Fisher Athletic F.C. (1908–2009), a defunct semi-professional football club in London
 The Fish, nickname of Fisher F.C., a non-League football team based in Bermondsey, founded in 2009
 The Fishes, nickname of Newport (Salop) Rugby Union Football Club, an English rugby team
 "The Fish", nickname of Real Quiet, an American Thoroughbred racehorse

Other uses
 The Fish (poem), a 1918 poem by Marianne Moore
 "The Fish" (short story), an 1885 short story by Anton Chekhov
 Fish, a kind of surfboard
 Fish, slang term for a torpedo
 Fish, a term for an inexperienced, easily victimized person in poker
 Fish or Christian fish, colloquial names for Ichthys
 Fish River (disambiguation)
 Forum on Information Standards in Heritage Information resources that support best practice in recording cultural heritage, including the FISH Vocabularies
 Fish! Philosophy, a motivational program for the workplace
 The Fish (train), a passenger train running between Lithgow and Sydney, Australia
 Pisces, the constellation or the namesake astrological sign, both known as "the fish"

See also
 FSH (disambiguation)
 Phish, an American jam band noted for their musical improvisation
 Phishing, an Internet crime
 Ghoti, a constructed word, pronounced "fish", used to illustrate irregularities in English spelling